The 2004–05 Syracuse Orange men's basketball team represented Syracuse University in the 2004–05 NCAA Division I season. This was the first season in which Syracuse used its current nickname of "Orange"; previously, Syracuse teams had been known as "Orangemen" and "Orangewomen", depending on sex. The head coach was Jim Boeheim, serving for his 29th year. The team played its home games at the Carrier Dome in Syracuse, New York.  The team finished with a 27–7 (11–5) record, while making it to the first round of the NCAA tournament. The team was led by senior Hakim Warrick and junior Gerry McNamara. Seniors Josh Pace and Craig Forth were also major contributors.

Due to NCAA sanctions for use of ineligible players, 15 wins from this season have been vacated.

Roster
Hakim Warrick (21.4 ppg, 8.7 rpg)
Gerry McNamara (15.8 ppg, 4.9 apg)
Josh Pace (10.8 ppg, 5.0 rpg)
Terrence Roberts (7.2 ppg, 3.9 rpg)
Louie McCroskey (5.6 ppg, 2.9 rpg)
Craig Forth (4.7 ppg, 5.1 rpg)
Demetris Nichols (3.9 ppg, 2.1 rpg)
Darryl Watkins (3.7 ppg, 3.4 rpg)

Developments
No. 4 seed Syracuse was upset by No. 13 seed Vermont in the first round of the NCAA tournament. It marked the first time a Boeheim-coached team had been knocked out in the first round since the 1998–1999 season.
Syracuse captured its first Big East title since 1992 as it beat Rutgers, Connecticut and West Virginia along the way. Warrick averaged better than 22 points in those three games and was named the Big East Conference Championship MVP and Big East Player of the Year.
Billy Edelin played just 20 games and left the team for undisclosed reasons after the team's Feb. 19 game against Boston College. Edelin would never play another game for Syracuse.
Syracuse captured the 2004 Coaches vs. Cancer Classic as then-No. 6 Syracuse defeated then-No. 24 Memphis, 77–62, at Madison Square Garden.
Syracuse started the season ranked No. 6 in the country.

References

Syracuse Orange
Syracuse Orange men's basketball seasons
Syracuse
Syracuse Orange men's basketball team
Syracuse Orange men's basketball team